Teresa Cheung Tak-lan is a Hong Kong singer.

Background
She participated in the entertainment industry since she was a child (stage name Cheung Yuen-yuen 張圓圓), and was a member of the Four Golden Flowers.

She rose to fame in Hong Kong through the 1980s on the back of a song that she sang for the TVB series The Good, The Bad And The Ugly. She also sang the main theme for the TV series The Return of the Condor Heroes (1983) and three of its subthemes. Additionally, the main theme songs for the TV series Princess Cheung Ping (1981) and Blood-Stained Intrigue (1986) were sung by her as well.

Personal life
In 1988 she married business director and arts administrator Frankie Yeung. She is also a Catholic.

Discography

Drama Soundtracks

References

1959 births
Living people
20th-century Hong Kong women singers
Hong Kong Roman Catholics
People from Shunde District
Place of birth missing (living people)